Henry Baum (born June 29, 1972) is an American writer, blogger and musician and is considered part of the Rebel Inc. writing movement.

Career
Baum is the author of five novels and several published short stories and prose. His book Oscar Caliber Gun (Later called The Golden Calf) has been translated into French. He has also published work with Identity Theory, Storyglossia, Scarecrow, Dogmatika, Purple prose, 3:AM Magazine, and Les Episodes. His book, The American Book Of The Dead was described by the widow of Philip K Dick, Tessa Dick, "If you read Lolita or A Clockwork Orange without drop-kicking the book out into the garden on a rainy day, this novel is for you.” He has published with Canongate and Cloverfield Press.

Awards
Baum has won three awards, the Gold IPPY Award for Visionary Fiction, Best Fiction at the DIY Book Festival and the Hollywood Book Festival Grand Prize. In 2013 he was one of seven finalists for Best Writer at The Erotic Awards in London UK, along with Belle de Jour (writer) aka Dr Brooke Magnanti, Pamela Stephenson and Alan Moore for his book God's Wife.

Film
A short film version of some of the scenes from The Golden Calf was made by director Ruben Fleischer while he was mentored by Robert Rodriguez at AFI. This film starred Kevin Corrigan, Elizabeth Berridge, Jay Johnston, Lelia Goldoni and Robert Joy.

Blogging
Henry Baum founded Self-Publishing Review a website for self-published authors. In 2012, he co-founded another website, Filmmaking Review. He also wrote a blog for some time under the female name Shirley Shave, which some readers took as a real-life blog of a sex worker, until Baum revealed his true identity. This blog took the form of God's Wife, released as a novel in 2012 with Shirley Shave as the main character.

Music
Baum has played drums and bass guitar in several bands including Semi-Gloss, Montag, and others. He has also released two solo albums under the name Ash Tree.

Early life
Baum was born and raised in New York, relocating to Los Angeles early on in his childhood, as his parents, Tom Baum and Carol Baum became established Hollywood TV and film professionals, with his father's scripts, Carny, starring Jodie Foster and The Sender, bringing a great deal of success to the family, as well as Carol Baum's production of many TV and film movies during the 1980s and 1990s.

Personal life
Baum is married to Cate Baum, his business partner at Filmmaking Review and Self-Publishing Review, a British writer and filmmaker. Baum has a daughter from his first marriage. He lives in Spain. In July 2013, Baum announced via Facebook he is suffering from CKD and started a campaign to look for a living kidney donor.

Bibliography
 North of Sunset (2007)
 The American Book Of The Dead (2011)
 Gentleman Reptile (2006)
 The Golden Calf (2008)
 The American Book Of The Dead Part II (2012)
 God's Wife (2012)
 Oscar Caliber Gun (2001)

References

External links
 Official Henry Baum site
 
 The Guardian on Self-Publishing Review
 Self-Publishing Review
 Podcast with Henry Baum

1972 births
Living people
21st-century American novelists
American male bloggers
American bloggers
American male novelists
Jewish American novelists
Postmodern writers
Crossroads School alumni
21st-century American male writers
20th-century American drummers
American male drummers
American male bass guitarists
21st-century American drummers
21st-century American bass guitarists
20th-century American male musicians
21st-century American male musicians
21st-century American Jews